On Tour (subtitled Toronto/Rochester) is a live album by multi-instrumentalist Joe McPhee's Trio X featuring bassist Dominic Duval and percussionist Jay Rosen recorded in 2001 and released on the Cadence Jazz label.

Reception

Allmusic reviewer Steve Loewy called it a "powerful live recording" and states "With the caliber of musicians comprising the trio, it is not surprising that there is a consistently high quality to these unusual interpretations, which, for the most part, merely hint at recognizable melodies... The three performers easily sustain interest for each of the lengthy tracks (the longest being nearly 22 minutes) without repeating themselves or running out of ideas. Pure joy". On All About Jazz John Sharpe said "it is an intriguing blend of the lyrical, whether composed or extemporised, and the abstract".

Track listing 

 "Monkin' Around (Blue Monk)" (Thelonious Monk) - 16:09
 "Try a Little Tenderness" (Jimmy Campbell, Reg Connelly, Harry Woods) - 13:06
 "My Funny Valentine" (Lorenz Hart, Richard Rodgers) - 13:39
 "Trail of Tears (For Jim Pepper)" [Referencing "Send in the Clowns" (Stephen Sondheim)] - 21:52 		
 "Old Eyes" (Joe McPhee) - 8:59

Personnel 
Joe McPhee - tenor saxophone, pocket trumpet
Dominic Duval - bass
Jay Rosen - drums

References 

Trio X live albums
2001 live albums
Cadence Jazz Records live albums